Nobuhiro (written: 信広, 信宏, 信尋, 信淵, 信弘, 信敬, 修宏, 修弘, 伸宏, 伸博, 伸洋, 敦弘, 敦彦, 暢彦, 順大, 順裕, 展裕, 伸啓, 宣浩, or 亘弘) is a masculine Japanese given name. Notable people with the name include:

, Japanese ice hockey player
, Japanese boxer
, Japanese footballer and manager
, Japanese footballer
, Japanese astronomer
, Japanese economist
, Japanese kugyō
, Japanese footballer
, Japanese golfer
, Japanese baseball player
, Japanese footballer
, Japanese daimyō
, Japanese painter
, Japanese politician
, Japanese footballer
, Japanese scientist
, Japanese footballer
Nobuhiro Sonoda (born 1949), Japanese luthier
, Japanese film director
, Japanese rally driver
, Japanese samurai
, Japanese footballer
, Japanese footballer
, Japanese politician
, Japanese mixed martial artist
, Japanese footballer and manager
, Japanese manga artist
, Japanese film director

Japanese masculine given names